Orlando Bridgeman may refer to:

Sir Orlando Bridgeman, 1st Baronet, of Great Lever (1606–1674), English Lord Chief Baron of the Exchequer, Chief Justice of the Common Pleas and Lord Keeper of the Great Seal
Sir Orlando Bridgeman, 1st Baronet, of Ridley (1649–1701), his son, English MP for Horsham
Sir Orlando Bridgeman, 2nd Baronet (1678–1746), his son, English MP for Coventry, Calne, Lostwithiel, Bletchingley and Dunwich
Sir Orlando Bridgeman, 4th Baronet (1695–1764), British MP for Shrewsbury
Orlando Bridgeman, 1st Earl of Bradford (1762–1825), British MP for Wigan, 1784–1800
Orlando Bridgeman, 3rd Earl of Bradford (1819–1898), British MP for South Shropshire, Vice-Chamberlain of the Household, Lord Chamberlain and Master of the Horse
Orlando Bridgeman, 5th Earl of Bradford (1873–1957), British soldier and Lord-in-Waiting
Orlando Bridgeman (1671–1721), English MP for Wigan (UK Parliament constituency), 1698–1701 and 1702–1705
Orlando Bridgeman (Ipswich MP) (1680–1731), English MP for Ipswich (UK Parliament constituency), 1714–1715
Orlando Bridgeman (RAF officer) (1898–1931), British World War I flying ace

See also
Bridgeman (surname)